Veyvah as a place name may refer to:
 Veyvah (Lhaviyani Atoll) (Republic of Maldives)
 Veyvah (Meemu Atoll) (Republic of Maldives)
 Veyvah (Raa Atoll) (Republic of Maldives)